The Count of Barcelona was the ruler of the County of Barcelona and also, by extension and according with the usages and Catalan constitutions, of the Principality of Catalonia as Princeps for much of Catalan history, from the 9th century until the 18th century.

History

The County of Barcelona was created by Charlemagne after he had conquered lands north of the river Ebro and Barcelona, after a siege in 801. These lands, historiographically known as the Marca Hispanica, were organized into various counties, of which the count of Barcelona, usually holding other counties simultaneously, eventually obtained the primacy over the region. As the county became hereditary in one family, the bond of the counts to their Frankish overlords loosened, especially after the Capetian dynasty supplanted the Carolingians.

In the 12th century, the counts of Barcelona became kings of Aragon through inheritance, establishing the Crown of Aragon. In 1258, the king of France relinquished his historical claims of feudal authority over the county in the Treaty of Corbeil. The counts were also hereditary kings of Castile from the 16th century, eventually forming the Monarchy of Spain. The title of count of Barcelona remained one of the many hereditary titles of the Spanish monarchy.

In the 20th century, the title regained some prominence when Juan de Borbón, the exiled heir to the Spanish throne, adopted the title of count of Barcelona. In doing so, he claimed a historical royal title without claiming to be the current king of Spain, especially after his son Juan Carlos became the prospective successor of the then-ruler of Spain, Francisco Franco.  In 1977, after Juan Carlos had become king upon Franco's death in 1975, he officially awarded the comital title to his father, who had renounced his rights to the throne. Juan held that title until his death in 1993, when it reverted to Juan Carlos. Juan de Borbón's widow used the title countess of Barcelona until her death in 2000.

List of counts of Barcelona

Non-dynastic (appointed by the rulers of the Carolingian Empire), 801–878

During this period, the County of Barcelona was one of many Counties at the March located in the Eastern Pyrenees and known as Gothia or Marca Hispanica. The Counts of this March were appointed by the Carolingian authorities.

House of Sunifred (Bellonids), 878–1162
The crisis of the Carolingian Empire, incapable of attending to the requests for help against the Moorish attacks coming from the Catalan counts, resulted in a disconnection between them and the Carolingian central power far North. The County of Barcelona became a hereditary title.

|-
|Wilfred I the Hairy878 –897||||c.840GironaDisputed filiation||Guinidilda87710 children||897Trempaged 46–47
|-
|Wilfred II Borrell I897 –26 April 911||||c.874Girona First son of Wilfred Iand Guinidilda||Garsenda8981 child||26 April 911Barcelonaaged 36–37
|-
|Sunyer26 April 911 –947||||c.890Girona Sixth son of Wilfred I and Guinidilda||Aimilda9141 childRichilde9255 children||15 October 950Lagrasseaged 59–60
|-
|Miro I947 –966||||c.926BarcelonaSecond son of Sunyer and Richilde||Unmarried||966aged 39–40
|-
|Borrell II947 –992(joint rule 947-966)||||c.927BarcelonaThird son of Sunyer and Richilde||Luitgarde9685 children||992aged 64–65
|-
|Ramon Borrell988 –8 September 1017(joint rule 988–992)||||26 May 972GironaSon of Borrell II and Luitgarde||Ermesinde of Carcassonne9932 children||8 September 1017Barcelonaaged 45
|-bgcolor="#EECCAA" 
|Ermesinde of Carcassonne993–10211035–1039(joint rule 993–1017); (regent 1017–1021, 1035–1039)||||972CarcassonneDaughter of Roger I of Carcassonne and Adelaide of Melgueil||Ramon I Borrell III9932 children||1 March 1058Sant Quirze de Besoraaged 85–86
|-
|Berenguer Ramon I the Crooked8 September 1017 –31 March 1035(under regency of Ermesinde of Carcassonne 1017–1021)||||1004Son of Ramon Borrell and Ermesinde of Carcassonne||Sancha of Castile10212 childrenGuisla of Lluçá10273 children||31 March 1035Barcelonaaged 30–31
|-
|Ramon Berenguer I the Old31 March 1035 –26 June 1076(under regency of Ermesinde of Carcassonne 1035–1039)||||1023GironaSon of Berenguer Ramon Iand Sancha of Castile||Élisabeth de Nîmes10393 childrenBlanche de Narbonne16 March 1051(annulled 1052)no childrenAlmodis de La Marche1056Barcelona(together since 1052)4 children||26 June 1076Barcelonaaged 52–53
|-bgcolor="#EECCAA" 
|Almodis de La Marche1052 –16 October 1071(joint rule)||||c.1020ToulouseDaughter of Bernard I de La Marche  and Amélie de Rasès|| Hugh V of Lusignan1038 (annulled c.1040)3 childrenPons, Count of Toulouse1040 or 1045 (annulled 1052)4 childrenRamon Berenguer I1056Barcelona(together since 1052)4 children||16 October 1071Barcelonaaged 50–51
|-
|Ramon Berenguer II the Towhead26 June 1076 –6 December 1082||||c.1053GironaFirst/Second son of Ramon Berenguer Iand Almodis de La Marche||Mafalda of Apulia-Calabria1078Barcelona3 children||6 December 1082Sant Feliu de Buixalleuaged 28–29
|-
|Berenguer Ramon II the Fratricide26 June 1076 –1097(joint rule 1076–1082)||||c.1053First/Second son of Ramon Berenguer Iand Almodis de La Marche||Unmarried||1097Jerusalemaged 43–44
|-
|Ramon Berenguer III the Great6 December 1082 –19 July 1131(joint rule 1082–1097)||||11 November 1082RodezSon of Ramon Berenguer IIand Mafalda of Apulia-Calabria||María Díaz de Vívar11032 childrenAlmodis de Mortain1106no childrenDouce I, Countess of Provence3 February 1112Arles7 children||19 July 1131Barcelonaaged 48
|-
|Ramon Berenguer IV the Saint19 July 1131 –6 August 1162||||c.1113Barcelona or RodezSon of Ramon Berenguer IIIand Douce I, Countess of Provence||Petronilla of AragonAugust 1150Lleida5 children||6 August 1162Borgo San Dalmazzoaged 48–49
|-
|}

The succession of Ramon Berenguer IV and Petronilla led to the creation of the Crown of Aragon.

House of Barcelona, 1164–1410

|Alphonse I the Troubadour18 July 1164 – 25 April 1196||||1-25 March 1157Huescason of Ramon Berenguer IV of Barcelona and Petronilla of Aragon||marriage agreement withMafalda of Portugal 1159-1162, not fulfilledSancha of Castile18 January 1174Zaragoza7 children||25 April 1196Perpignanaged 44
|-
|Peter I the Catholic25 April 1196 – 13 September 1213||||July 1178Huescason of Alfons I and Sancha of Castile||Marie of Montpellier15 June 12042 children||12 September 1213Battle of Muretaged 35
|-
|James I the Conqueror13 September 1213 – 27 July 1276||||2 February 1208Montpellierson of Peter I the Catholic and Marie of Montpellier||marriage agreement withAurembiaix, Countess of Urgell 1209, not fulfilledEleanor of Castile6 February 1221Ágreda1 childViolant of Hungary8 September 1235Barcelona10 childrenTeresa Gil de Vidaure (lover, then wife)1255(uncanonical marriage, repudiated 1260)2 children||27 July 1276Valenciaaged 68
|-
|Peter II the Great27 July 1276 – 2 November 1285||||July or August 1240Valenciason of James I and Violant of Hungary||Constance of Sicily13 June 1262Montpellier6 children||2 November 1285Vilafranca del Penedèsaged 45
|-
|Alphonse II the Liberal2 November 1285 – 18 June 1291||||4 November 1265Valenciason of Peter II and Constance of Sicily|| Eleanor of England15 August 1290 (by proxy and not consummated; death of the groom during bride's way to Aragon)||18 June 1291Barcelonaaged 27
|-
|James II the Fair18 June 1291 – 2 November 1327||||10 August 1267Valenciason of Peter II and Constance of Sicily||Isabella of Castile1 December 1291SoriaNo childrenBlanche of Anjou29 October or 1 November 1295Vilabertran10 childrenMarie de Lusignan15 June 1315 (by proxy)Nicosia27 November 1315 (in person)GironaNo childrenElisenda de Montcada25 December 1322TarragonaNo children||5 November 1327Barcelonaaged 60
|-
|Alphonse III the Kind2 November 1327 – 24 January 1336||||2 November 1299Naplesson of James II of Aragon and Blanche of Anjou||Teresa d'Entença1314Lerida7 childrenEleanor of Castile5 February 1329Tarazona2 children||27 January 1336Barcelonaaged 37
|-
|Peter III the Ceremonious24 January 1336 – 5 January 1387||||5 October 1319Balaguerson of Alphonse III and Teresa d'Entença||Maria of Navarre25 July 1337Zaragoza2 childrenLeonor of Portugal14 or 15 November 1347BarcelonaNo childrenEleanor of Sicily27 August 1349Valencia4 childrenSibila of Fortia11 October 1377Barcelona3 children||5 January 1387Barcelonaaged 68
|-
|John the Hunter5 January 1387 – 19 May 1396||||27 December 1350Perpignanson of Peter III and Eleanor of Sicily||marriage agreement with Jeanne-Blanche of France 1370-1371, not fulfilledMartha of Armagnac24 June 1373Barcelona5 childrenViolant of Bar2 February 1380Perpignan7 children||19 May 1396Foixàaged 46
|-
|Martin the Humanist19 May 1396 – 31 May 1410||||1356Gironason of Peter III and Eleanor of Sicily||Maria de Luna13 June 1372Barcelona4 childrenMargaret of Prades17 September 1409BarcelonaNo children||31 May 1410Barcelonaaged 54
|-
|}

House of Trastamara 1412-1462  

Martin died without legitimate descendants (interregnum 31 May 1410 – 24 June 1412). By the Compromise of Caspe of 1412 the County of Barcelona and the rest of the dominions of the Crown of Aragon passed to a branch of the House of Trastamara.

Catalan Civil War 1462-1472  

During the Catalan Civil War the Catalan authorities transferred the title of Count of Barcelona to a succession of 3 foreign sovereigns.

House of Trastamara (reinstated) 1472-1555 

After the Catalan Civil War, the House of Trastamara was restituted as tenants of the Count of Barcelona title and thus sovereigns of the Principality of Catalonia.

House of Habsburg 1516-1641

House of Bourbon at France (Reapers' War), 1641–1659

House of Habsburg (reinstated) 1659-1700 

In 1697 the Duke of Vendôme briefly re-conquers Catalan capital city of Barcelona, and Louis XIV of France was reinstated as Count of Barcelona for some months. On January 9, 1698, Catalonia is returned to Charles II after signing the Treaty of Rijswijk.

Spanish war of Succession 1700-1714 

Charles II's testament in favor of Philip of Anjou destabilized Western Europe because it meant too much power for the Kingdom of France. The rest of the European powers tried to impose another pretender to the Crown of Spain: the Archduke Charles of Austria. The Catalans were caught in the middle of this major conflict: the Spanish Succession War. They initially supported Philip of Anjou but afterward shifted their aligeance towards Archduke Charles, who was committed to maintaining the composite monarchy system and thus respect the Catalan Constitutions.

House of Bourbon (Spanish branch) 1714-1808 

In 1714, Catalan lost their war (within the Spanish war of Succession conflict) against the remaining sole pretender to the Crown of Spain: Philip of Anjou. Through the Nueva Planta decrees, the new king Philip V abolished the Catalan Constitutions and dissolved the Crown of Aragon. The Principality of Catalonia became another province of the Crown of Castille, and thus the title of Count of Barcelona was emptied of real political significance and power.
Since then, the numbering of the Counts of Barcelona follows that of the Crown of Castille. That is the reason why Philip of Anjou was called by the Catalan Authorities 'Felip IV' in 1702 but called himself 'Felipe V' when he sized the title of Count of Barcelona in 1714, after winning the war against the Catalans.

House of Bonaparte 1808-1813 

In 1808 Charles IV and his son Ferdinand resign from their Crown of Spain titles and transfer them to Emperor Napoleon, who kept for himself the title of Count of Barcelona. By 1812, once he had full military control over the Principality of Catalonia, he separated it from the Crown of Spain and annexed it to the French Empire.

House of Bourbon (restored) 1813-1868 

Isabella of Spain was deposed by a liberal revolution and went into exile.

House of Savoy 1870–1873 
After a brief Republican period, the Spanish government offered the kingship and its accessory titles (including that of 'Count of Barcelona') to Amadeo Duke of Aosta and son of the king of Italy Victor Emmanuel II.

House of Bourbon (restored) 1874–1931 

A pronunciamiento deposed the Republican government that followed the abdication of Amadeo I and restored the Bourbons as kings of Spain.

In the 12 April 1931 municipal elections, the Republicans short of winning a majority of councilors overall, won a sweeping majority in major cities. These elections were perceived as a plebiscite on the monarchy, and the king left the country and the Second Spanish Republic was proclaimed on 14 April 1931.

House of Bourbon (in exile) 1931–1975 
During the 2nd Spanish Republic and Francoist Dictatorship the Bourbons remained in exile and retained their dynastic titles, including 'Count of Barcelona'.

House of Bourbon (restored) 1975 – present day 
Although on 26 July 1947, Spain was declared a kingdom, no monarch was designated until 1969, when Franco established Juan Carlos of Bourbon as his official heir. With the death of Franco on 20 November 1975, Juan Carlos became the King of Spain.

See also
List of Aragonese monarchs
List of Spanish monarchs
List of Viscounts of Barcelona

References 

Barcelona
Barcelona
Crown of Aragon
House of Barcelona

pt:Condado de Barcelona